Turtle Back Zoo is a zoo in West Orange, New Jersey. Founded in 1963, the zoo was originally a showcase for animals indigenous to the New York metropolitan area, but currently features species from every continent except Antarctica. As of 2018, it houses approximately 1400 animals, including several hundred birds in a free-flight aviary. Located adjacent to the Richard J. Codey Arena, former practice home of the New Jersey Devils, the zoo is open year-round, weather permitting.

The Turtle Back Zoo has been an accredited member of the Association of Zoos and Aquariums (AZA) since 2006. In 2017, the zoo became an accredited member of ZAA (Zoological Association of America).

History

Turtle Back Zoo, which took its name from a nearby rock formation, opened in 1963 with a collection of 140 animals representing 40 species. It was originally opened seasonally and had a Hans Christian Andersen "storybook theme," with such exhibits as "a giant piggy bank, the ABC house, [and] the pirates’ ship". By 1973 the zoo was home to 850 animals representing 275 species.

In 1975, the Zoological Society of New Jersey was established to help promote the zoo and provide funding. Despite this, Turtle Back Zoo fell into disrepair, and was almost shut down in 1995.

In 2000, the zoo created a master plan with the objective of improving the zoo enough to receive accreditation from the Association of Zoos and Aquariums (AZA). Between 2003 and 2006, Turtle Back received approximately $20 million in funding, which was used to improve the facilities, and in 2006 the zoo received its first accreditation. New facilities included the Essex County Animal Hospital on zoo grounds, and a new  entrance/administrative complex with a  reptile center, classrooms, and an auditorium.

In 2016, zoo attendance exceeded 700,000 visitors for the first time in its history.

Expansion concerns
Residents of Essex County have lobbied for expansion of the zoo to cease, citing traffic congestion and disruption of the surrounding South Mountain Reservation. In July 2019, Essex County officials announced the construction of a proposed amphitheater, grizzly bear exhibit, and overnight camping. Essex County officials reported in September 2019 that as a result of the backlash, the amphitheater was scaled back, though no exact details were released. Due to the COVID-19 pandemic, the amphitheater plans were put on hold in 2020.

Exhibits

Exhibits include an American black bear exhibit; the Essex Farm, which holds common farm animals and includes a petting zoo; and the Tropical Currents Aquarium, which exhibits fish from around the world in six large tanks; African Adventure's first enclosure which exhibits Masai giraffes, Common Eland, Ostriches, White-faced whistling ducks and Bontebok.

Reptile center 
The $4.6 million reptile house and education center, the zoo's first indoor exhibit, opened in June 2006. When the  reptile center opened, it contained a pair of nine-foot-long "black dragons", a species of monitor lizard which was discovered in Malaysia in 2005 and has yet to receive a scientific name. The Reptile House's main exhibit now contains a Komodo dragon, an animal born by parthenogenesis. The reptile house also contains amphibians, some birds, and other reptiles including a rare African dwarf crocodile.

Island Giants 
Island Giants is an upcoming sub-attractional exhibit opening in 2023, that will be a brand new home for the Komodo dragon and American alligator.

Amazing Asia 
This regional exhibit is home to gibbons, red pandas, clouded leopards, a pygmy slow loris, and an amur and snow leopard exhibit. The gibbon habitat, a $1.8 million exhibit that opened in 2009 as the first exhibit for Amazing Asia, contains an  outdoor mesh tent habitat that is home to the zoo's five white-cheeked gibbons. The leopard exhibit is one of the latest exhibits, opening in 2018. After Amazing Asia was renovated in September 2022, the exhibit allowed the zoo's red pandas and clouded leopards to have more room to roam.

African Adventure 
In May 2016, the zoo opened their three-acre African Adventure attraction. The $7 million addition is designed to mimic an African Savannah and contains four Masai giraffes. In addition the exhibit contains: eland, whistling ducks, ostriches, bonteboks, and an Aldabra giant tortoise. As of spring 2017, this ancient exhibit includes lions and a pack of hyenas.

Shores of Africa 
Shores of Africa forms part of the African Adventure and features a penguin enclosure that's home to Pink-backed pelicans and Is full of African penguins that love to swim in an indoor pool, Guests are able to experience underwater viewing while watching the penguins. This small dark exhibit is also home to a Lesser bushbaby.

Wolf Woods 
Wolf Woods is the wolf exhibit where the wolves sleep in a den. It is currently the home of two subspecies of gray wolf.

Sea lions and Touch tank 
This exhibit features an 82,000-gallon pool for California sea lions and a 1,600-gallon touch tank for sting rays and small sharks, along with space for education programs and special events. This $5.5 million exhibit was opened in 2013.

Big Cat Country 
The exhibit features cougars and jaguars and has a Southwest United States theme. The animals’ area has rock outcroppings, a waterfall and indigenous Southwest plantings. Viewing areas resemble a southwest mine or cave and stamped concrete pathways for visitors resemble a southwest trail. The big cat area has an indoor winter refuge area for the animals and secure holding areas. It also is being used as a breeding facility. This $3 million exhibit was opened in 2011.

Drill family flamingo exhibit 
In the summer of 2018, the zoo opened a new exhibit for the American flamingo and the Hyacinth macaw. The current flamingo habitat was the zoo's old penguin exhibit, which got demolished and replaced by a home for new tropical birds.

Other attractions

There are several attractions at the zoo, including a train ride, carousel, and playground.  All the zoo's attractions are part of the South Mountain Recreation Complex.

The Turtle Back Zoo Railroad is a  narrow gauge railroad attraction that opened with the rest of the zoo in 1963. The railroad originally operated two S-24 Iron Horse trains manufactured by Allan Herschell. These were replaced in 1984 and 1999 by C. P. Huntington trains manufactured by Chance Rides. In April 2015, the railroad received a third C. P. Huntington locomotive from a Livingston resident as part of a program to commemorate the 150th anniversary of Abraham Lincoln's death. From 2019 to 2020, the railroad underwent a renovation to make room for a third parking deck, including a realignment of a portion of the route, a renovated platform, and a new train maintenance building. In 2020, Investors Bank (now part of Citizens Financial Group) became the official sponsor of the railroad.

The Endangered Species Carousel, a custom built carousel opened in 2008, is located inside a beautiful classic carousel house with mosaic floors and stained glass windows. Riders are seated on one of 30 endangered species, which includes pandas, alligators, and tigers.

On September 25, 2010, the Turtle Back Zoo opened the Essex County Safari MiniGolf course. Designed by French & Parrello Associates, P.A., the miniature golf course replicates three African regions: the Sahara Desert, the African Grasslands, and the Congo located to the center is Mount Kilimanjaro. The miniature golf course consists of 19 holes and contains various animal sculptures, such as a camel, an elephant, a gorilla, a lion and more.

In the following years, the zoo opened several more facilities, including the Treetop Adventure Ropes Course in September 2011, an education center in July 2014, and a new 15,000 square foot, $2 million, sea turtle recovery center in 2016.

A $2 million on-site veterinary hospital includes a full surgery suite, in addition to x-ray and ultrasound facilities. In May 2022, it was renamed as the “Essex County Barry H. Ostrowsky Animal Wellness Center”, in honor of the president and CEO of RWJBarnabas Health.

References

External links 

Zoological Society of New Jersey, Inc. website
Article on attendance figures and recent additions to the zoo

Buildings and structures in Essex County, New Jersey
Zoos in New Jersey
1963 establishments in New Jersey
Tourist attractions in Essex County, New Jersey
Watchung Mountains
West Orange, New Jersey
Zoos established in 1963